The 2009–10 Isle of Man League was the 101st season of the Isle of Man Football League on the Isle of Man.

League tables

Premier League

Division 2

Cups
Cup results for 2009–10:

FA Cup

St Georges   3–2 AET    Rushen United

Railway Cup
Peel   2–0    Rushen United

Hospital Cup
Douglas HSOB   1–2    Peel

Woods Cup
Douglas Royal   4–0    Ayre United

Paul Henry Gold Cup
Ayre United   bt on pens    Pulrose United

Cowell Cup (U19)
Castletown Metropolitan   3–0    Ramsey YCOB

References

FA Full Time – IOM Football League 2009–10 Premier Division
FA Full Time – IOM Football League 2009–10 Division Two

Isle of Man Football League seasons
Man
Foot
Foot